Rhododendron rarilepidotum is a rhododendron species native to Sumatra, where it grows at altitudes of . The flowers are orange or yellow, and broadly funnel-shaped.

References
 Contr. Arnold Arbor. 8: 126 1934.
 Argent, G. (2006) Rhododendrons of subgenus Vireya. RHS:London. Page:243
 The Plant List
 Encyclopedia of Life
 Hirsutum.com
 Vireya.net
 Pat Halliday, "Rhododendron rarilepidotum", Curtis's Botanical Magazine, Volume 1, Issue 1, pages 20–22, April 1984.

rarilepidotum